Datuk Joseph Entulu Belaun (born 8 June 1954) is a Malaysian politician. He was a Minister in the Prime Minister's Department and a Member of Parliament (MP) for the Selangau constituency in Sarawak, representing the Sarawak People's Party (PRS) from 2004 until the dissolution of the Parliament on 7 April 2018.

Political career
Entulu was elected to Parliament in the 2004 general elections. Immediately after his election in 2004, Entulu was appointed to the federal level as Deputy Minister in the Prime Minister's Department. Before his election, he was Assistant Minister to the Chief Minister of Sarawak. He was first elected to Parliament as a member of the Sarawak Native People's Party (PBDS), but joined the PRS after the Parti Bansa Dayak Sarawak (PBDS) was deregistered in 2004. 

Entulu was re-elected unopposed to Parliament in the 2008 general elections. Following the 2008 general elections he became Deputy Minister of Rural and Regional Development and in October 2008, he was also conferred the title of Datuk.

He has spoken out against the use of the term Dayak as a generic descriptor of Sarawak's indigenous non-Muslim residents, preferring instead specific terms for each community in 2009.

After he was re-elected again in the 2013 general elections, Entulu was promoted to a full minister as a Minister in the Prime Minister's Department.

On 13 May 2018, People's Justice Party (PKR) Women chief Zuraida Kamaruddin announced that Entulu has joined its ranks as a PKR party member in a press conference in Cheras.

Entulu has joined Parti Sarawak Bersatu (PSB) since March 2019. Prior to that, he was the Deputy President of the PRS until his sacking in April 2018, which was announced by the PRS President Dr. James Jemut Masing.

Election results

Honours

Honours of Malaysia
  :
  Commander of the Order of the Star of Hornbill Sarawak (PGBK) - Datuk (2008)

References

1954 births
Living people
People from Sarawak
Iban people
Parti Rakyat Sarawak politicians
Parti Bansa Dayak Sarawak politicians
Government ministers of Malaysia
Members of the Dewan Rakyat
Members of the Sarawak State Legislative Assembly
Commanders of the Order of the Star of Hornbill Sarawak
21st-century Malaysian politicians